Phillip Hung Chew (born May 16, 1994) is an American badminton player. He won two gold medals in men's and mixed doubles at the 2015 Pan American Games. Chew also participated in the 2016 Rio and 2020 Tokyo Summer Olympics. He won the 2021 Pan Am Badminton Championships doubles with his brother Ryan Chew. He trains at the Orange County Badminton Club, which is founded by his grandfather, Don Chew.

Career 
In 2016, Chew represented the United States in both mixed and men's doubles events at the 2016 Summer Olympics.

Chew made his second appearance at the Olympic Games in 2020 Tokyo. He competing in the men's doubles event partnered with Ryan Chew, but he was eliminated in the group stage.

Achievements

Pan American Games 
Men's doubles

Mixed doubles

Pan Am Championships 
Men's doubles

Mixed doubles

BWF International Challenge/Series 
Men's doubles

Mixed doubles

  BWF International Challenge tournament
  BWF International Series tournament

Junior career 
 1999 U.S. Junior National Badminton Championships – Gold (U9 boys' doubles, U9 boys' singles)
 2000 U.S. Junior National Badminton Championships – Gold (U9 boys' doubles, U9 boys' singles)
 2001 U.S. Junior National Badminton Championships – Gold (U9 boys' singles)
 2002 Pan American Junior Badminton Championships – Silver (U11 mixed doubles, U11 boys' doubles)
 2002 U.S. Junior National Badminton Championships – Gold (U9 mixed doubles, U9 boys' doubles, U9 boys' singles)
 2003 U.S. Junior National Badminton Championships – Gold (U11 mixed doubles, U11 boys' doubles, U11 boys' singles)
 2004 U.S. Junior National Badminton Championships – Gold (U11 mixed doubles, boys' singles); Silver (boys' doubles)
 2005 U.S. Junior National Badminton Championships – Gold (U13 mixed doubles, U13 boys' doubles, U13 boys' singles)
 2006 U.S. Junior National Badminton Championships – Silver (U13 boys' doubles); Gold (U13 boys' singles)
 2007 U.S. Junior National Badminton Championships – Gold (U15 mixed doubles, U15 boys' doubles, U15 boys' singles)
 2008 Pan American Junior Badminton Championships – Gold (U15 mixed doubles, U15 boys' doubles, U15 boys' singles)
 2008 U.S. Junior National Badminton Championships – Gold (U15 mixed doubles, U15 boys' doubles, U15 boys' singles)
 2009 Pan American Junior Badminton Championships – Gold (U17 mixed doubles)
 2009 U.S. Junior National Badminton Championships – Gold (U17 mixed doubles, boys' doubles)
 2010 U.S. Junior National Badminton Championships – Gold (U17 mixed doubles, U17 boys' doubles, U17 boys' singles)
 2011 U.S. Junior National Badminton Championships – Gold (U19 boys' doubles, U19 mixed doubles)
 2012 Pan Am Juniors – Gold (boys' doubles, mixed doubles)

References

External links 
 
 
 Phillip Chew at Toronto2015.org
 
 

1994 births
Living people
Sportspeople from Anaheim, California
Sportspeople from Orange County, California
American sportspeople of Chinese descent
American male badminton players
Badminton players at the 2016 Summer Olympics
Badminton players at the 2020 Summer Olympics
Olympic badminton players of the United States
Badminton players at the 2015 Pan American Games
Badminton players at the 2019 Pan American Games
Pan American Games gold medalists for the United States
Pan American Games silver medalists for the United States
Pan American Games medalists in badminton
Medalists at the 2015 Pan American Games
Medalists at the 2019 Pan American Games